Lieutenant (later Major) Earl Frederick Crabb (March 27, 1899 – October 18, 1986) was a World War I flying ace credited with six aerial victories. After World War I, he was an aviation pioneer and bush pilot. He returned to military aviation during World War II. He flew as a commercial pilot until he was 72 years old.

World War I
Crabb served in 92 Squadron under the command of fellow ace and future Air Marshal Arthur Coningham. Crabbe flew a Royal Aircraft Factory SE.5a to score all six of his victories. They took place between 22 July and 29 October 1918. Crabbe downed five German Fokker D.VII fighters and a DFW reconnaissance plane; the latter kill was shared with fellow ace Thomas Stanley Horry and another pilot.

Crabb was awarded a Distinguished Flying Cross on 8 February 1919.

Between the wars
Crabb remained in aviation after war's end. He barnstormed. He flew air mail from Boston and New York to Detroit during the 1920s. In the early 1930s, he was the first pilot hired by the U.S. Forest Service in Maine.

World War II and beyond
Crabb returned to duty for World War II as a major, joining the U.S. Army Air Corps and serving in Training Command. After his discharge in 1945, he returned to his civilian flying job. He retired as Chief Pilot with the Forest Service at age 65, circa 1964. He continued to fly as a commercial pilot until about 1971.

References

 Above the Trenches: a Complete Record of the Fighter Aces and Units of the British Empire Air Forces 1915-1920. Christopher F. Shores, Norman L. R. Franks, Russell Guest. Grub Street, 1990. , .

1899 births
1986 deaths
Canadian World War I flying aces
Recipients of the Distinguished Flying Cross (United Kingdom)
People from Norfolk County, Ontario
People from Tamarac, Florida
Commercial aviators